Everything's Different Now is the third and final studio album by the American band 'Til Tuesday, released in 1988. (see 1988 in music).

Track listing
 "Everything's Different Now" (Jules Shear, Matthew Sweet) – 3:56
 "Rip in Heaven" (Aimee Mann, Kit Hain) – 3:31
 "Why Must I" (Mann) – 3:42
 "'J' for Jules" (Mann) – 4:26
 "(Believed You Were) Lucky" (Mann, Shear) – 3:38
 "Limits to Love" (Mann) – 3:36
 "Long Gone (Buddy)" (Mann, Michael Hausman) – 4:34
 "The Other End (Of the Telescope)" (Mann, Declan MacManus) – 3:53
 "Crash and Burn" (Mann, Hain) – 4:46
 "How Can You Give Up?" (Mann, Hausman) – 3:38

Personnel
'Til Tuesday
Aimee Mann – vocals, bass and acoustic guitar
Michael Hausman – drums, percussion and programming
Robert Holmes – guitars and background vocals
Michael Montes – keyboards
with:
Haeryung Shin – violin
Peter Abrams – French horn
Marcus Miller – additional bass on "How Can You Give Up?" and "Long Gone (Buddy)"
Elvis Costello – background vocals on "The Other End (Of the Telescope)"
Tiger Okoshi – trumpet and horn arrangement on "How Can You Give Up?"
Hal Crook – trombone on "How Can You Give Up?"
Mike Denneen – additional keyboards on "How Can You Give Up?"
Technical
Bruce Lampcov, Mike Denneen, Rhett Davies, Rob Jaczko, Steve Rinkoff - engineer
Neil Dorfsman, Rhett Davies, Rob Jaczko - mixing
Lara Rossignol - photography

Charts
Album – Billboard (United States)

Singles – Billboard (United States)

References

'Til Tuesday albums
1988 albums
Albums produced by Rhett Davies
Epic Records albums